Minuscule 615 (in the Gregory-Aland numbering), α 560 (von Soden), is a Greek minuscule manuscript of the New Testament, on paper. Palaeographically it has been assigned to the 15th century. Tischendorf labeled it by 138a and 173p.

Description 

The codex contains the text of the Pauline epistles and Catholic epistles on 202 paper leaves (size ). The text is written in one column per page, 19 lines per page. 

The order of books: Pauline epistles and Catholic epistles. Hebrews is placed after Epistle to Philemon.
It contains Martyrium Pauli.

Text 

Aland the Greek text of the codex did not place in any Category.

History 

The manuscript once belonged to J. P. Pinelli.

The manuscript was added to the list of New Testament manuscripts by Johann Martin Augustin Scholz. Scholz examined it very slightly. Gregory saw the manuscript in 1886.

Formerly it was labeled by 138a and 173p. In 1908 Gregory gave the number 615 to it.

The manuscript currently is housed at the Biblioteca Ambrosiana (E. 102 sup.), at Milan.

See also 

 List of New Testament minuscules
 Biblical manuscript
 Textual criticism

References

Further reading 

 
 Catalogus graecorum Bibliothecace Ambrosianae (Mediolani 1906), vol. I, pp. 353-354.

Greek New Testament minuscules
15th-century biblical manuscripts
Manuscripts of the Ambrosiana collections